Guglielmo Sanfelice d'Acquavilla O.S.B.Cas.  (14 April 1834 – 3 January 1897) was a Cardinal of the Roman Catholic Church and Archbishop of Naples. 

Sanfelice d'Acquavilla was born in Aversa, Italy, on 14 April 1834.

He was appointed Archbishop of Naples in 1878 and served until his death in 1897.

He was made cardinal by Pope Leo XIII in 1884.

Sanfelice d'Acquavilla died in Naples on 3 January 1897.

References

1834 births
1897 deaths
People from Aversa
19th-century Italian cardinals
Italian Benedictines
Benedictine bishops
Benedictine cardinals
Cardinals created by Pope Leo XIII